Silvestrin is a surname of Italian origin. Notable people with the surname include: 

 Claudio Silvestrin (born 1954), Italian architect and designer
 Enrico Silvestrin (born 1972), Italian actor and media personality

Italian-language surnames